"Primavera in anticipo (It Is My Song)" (English: "Anticipated Spring") is a pop duet between Italian singer Laura Pausini and British singer-songwriter James Blunt. It was released as the second single from Pausini's album Primavera in anticipo. The single was released on 2 January 2009. The song was also featured on the deluxe version of Blunt's second studio album, All the Lost Souls. The single was very successful in Europe, however, was not released in the UK or Ireland. The single was released simultaneously digitally and physically.

Release
The single was released on one digital and physical format, both containing the same track listing. The song was backed with a Spanish version, "Primavera Anticipada (It Is My Song)".

Music video
A music video was released in many European territories. The video features Blunt and Pausini together in an Italian mansion, however, both are locked in separate, empty rooms with only their instruments to keep them company. As the song progresses, Blunt starts a fire in his room which spreads to the main hall of the building, leading to him having to rescue Pausini. The video was included on the deluxe edition bonus DVD of Blunt's All the Lost Souls.

Live performances

"Primavera in anticipo" was chosen by Pausini to close all her World Tour 2009 concerts. The performance of the song in Monza was recorded and released in the Laura Live World Tour 09 live album. On 21 June 2009, as part of the "Amiche per l'Abruzzo" beneficent concert, Pausini shared the vocals of the song with Giorgia Todrani.

The song is also present on Pausini's Inedito World Tour. During such performances, images of a forest during the spring are shown in the videowall.

Usage
"Primavera in anticipo (It Is My Song)" was included as a solo live version on the album Laura Live World Tour 09 (audio and video) and its Spanish-language version Laura Live Gira Mundial 09 (video) in 2009, whilst "Primavera anticipada (It Is My Song)" was included on the audio disc of the latter.

"Primavera in anticipo (It Is My Song)" as a duet, was included in the special edition of James Blunt's All the Lost Souls.

Track listing
CDS - Promo Warner Music Europe
"Primavera in anticipo (It Is My Song)" (with James Blunt)

CDS - Promo Warner Music Mexico
"Primavera anticipada (It Is My Song)" (with James Blunt)

CDS - 5051865353522 Warner Music Italy
"Primavera in anticipo (It Is My Song)" (with James Blunt)
"Primavera in anticipo"
"Invece no"

CDS - Warner Music Mexico
"Primavera anticipada (It Is My Song)" (with James Blunt)
"Primavera in anticipo (It Is My Song)" (with James Blunt)
"Primavera anticipada"

Digital download
"Primavera in anticipo (It Is My Song)" (with James Blunt)
"Primavera in anticipo"
"Primavera anticipada (It Is My Song)" (with James Blunt)
"Primavera anticipada"

Charts

Weekly charts

Year-end charts

Certifications

References

2009 singles
Laura Pausini songs
James Blunt songs
Macaronic songs
Number-one singles in Austria
Songs written by James Blunt
Songs written by Cheope
Songs written by Laura Pausini
2008 songs
Atlantic Records singles
Songs written by Daniel Vuletic
Male–female vocal duets